The 2012–13 VfL Osnabrück season was the 114th season in the club's football history. In 2012–13 the club played in the 3. Liga, the third tier of German football. It was the club's second consecutive season in this league, having been relegated from the 2. Bundesliga in 2011.

The club also took part in the 2012–13 edition of the Lower Saxony Cup, having reached the quarter finals against fourth division side TSV Havelse after a 3–2 win over SV Meppen. In the quarter finals, they won against TSV Havelse 6–5 by penalties to reach the semi finals.

They finished the 2012–13 season in third position, gaining the spot to play in the 2. Bundesliga relegation playoff game. They faced Dynamo Dresden but lost in the away leg, making the aggregate score of 1–2, thus making them still in the 3. Liga.

Matches

Legend

Friendly matches

3. Liga

2. Bundesliga Relegation Playoff

Lower Saxony Cup

Sources

External links
 2012–13 VfL Osnabrück season at Weltfussball.de 
 2012–13 VfL Osnabrück season at kicker.de 
 2012–13 VfL Osnabrück season at Fussballdaten.de 

Osnabruck
VfL Osnabrück seasons